Ayiman Suroor Marhoon Al-Maawali (born 25 April 1980), commonly known as Ayiman Suroor, is an Omani footballer who played for Al-Seeb Club from 2003 to 2004 in the Omani League.

International career
Ayiman was selected for the national team for the first time in 2004. He has made appearances in the 2004 Asian Cup and the 2006 FIFA World Cup qualification.

References

External links

1980 births
Living people
Omani footballers
Oman international footballers
Association football midfielders
2004 AFC Asian Cup players
Al-Seeb Club players